National Tertiary Route 732, or just Route 732 (or ) is a National Road Route of Costa Rica, located in the Alajuela province.

Description
In Alajuela province the route covers Upala canton (Aguas Claras, San José districts).

References

Highways in Costa Rica